Pippa "Pips" Bunce (born Philip Bunce) is a British banking executive. Bunce, who is non-binary and genderfluid, is a senior director at Credit Suisse. They serve as the Head of Global Markets Core Engineering Strategic Programs and as the Co-Chair of the LGBT Ally Program at Credit Suisse. In 2018, Bunce was awarded one of the Top 100 Women in Business by the Financial Times. They were also listed on the Financial Times and OUTstanding LGBT and Ally Executive List and were including in the Top 10 Inspiring Leaders list at the British LGBT Awards. In 2022, Bunce received a British Diversity Award.

Career 
Bunce is a senior director at Credit Suisse, serving as the Head of Global Markets Core Engineering Strategic Programs. They also serve as Co-Chair of Credit Suisse's LGBT Ally Program, organizing diversity and inclusion activities and producing educational resources on LGBT inclusivity in the workplace.

In 2018, they were listed on the Financial Times and HERoes Champions of Women in Business List, ranking thirty-second in the Top 100 Women in Business. Upon receiving the award, Bunce made a statement saying, "I am truly honoured and humbled by this award and am proud of the progress we are making towards all forms of gender diversity and equality." In March 2022, Bunce received the British Diversity Award. They were also listed in the Top 10 Inspiring Leaders at the British LGBT Awards and was included, in fourth place, on the Financial Times and OUTstanding LGBT and Ally Executive List.

Bunce is a member of St. George's House.

Personal life 
Bunce is a graduate of Anglia Ruskin University. They identify as genderfluid and non-binary and use feminine and gender neutral pronouns. In an interview with the Financial News in 2017, Bunce said they knew they were "different" since the age of four and that they waited until their career at Credit Suisse was established before publicly coming out.

Bunce is married and has two children.

References 

Living people
Alumni of Anglia Ruskin University
British corporate directors
British investment bankers
British LGBT businesspeople
Credit Suisse people
Genderfluid people
Year of birth missing (living people)